The following is a list of arts and entertainment venues in Singapore.

List

References

Lists of theatres
Lists of entertainment venues
Lists of music venues
Arts and entertainment venues